Pamina (minor planet designation: 539 Pamina) is a minor planet orbiting the Sun. It is named for the heroine of Mozart's opera, The Magic Flute.

References

External links 
 
 

000539
Discoveries by Max Wolf
Named minor planets
539 Pamina
539 Pamina
000539
19040802